Jacques Zegers (born 25 June 1947, Brussels) is a Belgian singer, best known for his participation in the 1984 Eurovision Song Contest.

Early career 
Born in Brussels to a Belgian mother and French father, Zegers began singing in cabaret at the age of 16 and in his spare time would participate in song contests while pursuing a career as a journalist. He released two singles, "La nuit" and "Pour elle", in 1983. He was then asked to record "LA en Olympie", the official Belgian song for the 1984 Summer Olympics.

Eurovision Song Contest 
In 1984, Zegers's song "Avanti la vie" was chosen as the Belgian representative in the 29th Eurovision Song Contest which took place on 5 May in Luxembourg City. "Avanti la vie" scored 70 points to finish in fifth place of 19 entries.

Later career 

After Eurovision, Zegers released one more single, "1001 amis", and continued to pursue his journalistic career. He published a novel entitled Le nœud and several volumes of poetry.

Discography 

Singles

"La nuit" (1983)
"Pour elle" (1983)
"LA en Olympie" (1984)
"Avanti la vie" (1984)
"1001 amis" (1984)

References 

Belgian male singers
Eurovision Song Contest entrants for Belgium
Eurovision Song Contest entrants of 1984
Musicians from Brussels
1947 births
Living people